Camaïeu was a French retail clothing company which manufactured and sold its own collections of women's clothing.

Operations
Mainly aimed towards women 20 to 40 years old, the company operated a chain of boutiques in Belgium, Czech Republic (to 2020), France, Hungary (to 2020), Italy (to 2020), Morocco, Poland (to 2020), Romania, Russia, Slovakia (to 2020) and Spain.  In 2007, the company opened its 600th boutique. , Elizabeth Cunin became CEO after leaving Comptoir des Cotonniers and Princess Tam Tam.

On October 1, 2022 Camaïeu shut down.

References

Clothing companies of France
French brands
French companies established in 1984
2022 disestablishments in France
Retail companies established in 1984
Retail companies disestablished in 2022